Don't Mind If I Do may refer to:

 "I don't mind if I do", a catchphrase of Colonel Humphrey Chinstrap  on the 1940s British radio comedy show It's That Man Again
 I Don't Mind If I Do, 1950 book by Elspeth Huxley

Music
 Don't Mind If I Do (Culture Club album), 1999
 Don't Mind If I Do, a 1992 album by Jerry Jerry and the Sons of Rhythm Orchestra
 "I Don't Mind If I Do", song on the 1966 album The First of the Irish Rovers by The Irish Rovers
 "Don't Mind If I Do", song on the 1988 album If You Ain't Lovin' You Ain't Livin' by George Strait
 "Don't Mind If I Do", song on the 1988 album Ain't Complaining by Status Quo
 "Don't Mind If I Do", 2003 song by Dead Low Tide
 "Don't Mind If I Do", song on the 2010 mixtape K.I.D.S by Mac Miller
 "Don't Mind If I Do", song on the 2012 album Push Rewind by Chris Wallace
 "Don't Mind If I Do", 2021 song by David James

See also
 "Thrash?! Don't Mind If I Do", song on the 2003 album Waste 'Em All by Municipal Waste